is a Japanese footballer who plays for Albirex Niigata.

He is the twin brother of Kota Hoshi, who currently plays for SC Sagamihara.

Club statistics
Updated to 2 May 2021.

References

External links
Profile at Oita Trinita

Profile at Renofa Yamaguchi
Profile at Albirex Niigata

1992 births
Living people
Hosei University alumni
Association football people from Kanagawa Prefecture
Japanese footballers
J1 League players
J2 League players
J3 League players
Fukushima United FC players
Renofa Yamaguchi FC players
Oita Trinita players
Albirex Niigata players
Association football defenders